Madonna: Innocence Lost is a 1994 American drama film directed by Bradford May and written by Michael J. Murray based on Christopher Andersen's biography of the star, Madonna Unauthorized. The film stars Terumi Matthews, Wendie Malick, Jeff Yagher, Diana Leblanc, Dean Stockwell and Nigel Bennett. The film premiered on Fox on November 29, 1994.

Plot

Cast 
Terumi Matthews as Madonna
Stephane Scalia as Madonna (age 4)
Maia Filar as Madonna (age 10)
Wendie Malick as Camille Barbone
Jeff Yagher as Paul
Diana Leblanc as Ruth Novak
Dean Stockwell as Tony Ciccone
Nigel Bennett as Bennett
Dominique Briand as Toussant
Don Francks as Jerome Kirkland
Tom Melissis as Stu
Christian Vidosa as Emmerich
Rod Wilson as Mitch Roth
Dino Bellisario as Brad Raines
Gil Filar as Madonna's brother
Diego Fuentes as Salvador
Matthew Godfrey as Peter Barbone
Ephraim Hylton as Thom Hillman
Evon Murphy as Bette Ciccone
Jenny Parsons as Madonna Louise Ciccone I
Cynthia Preston as Jude O'Mally 
Chandra West as Kelsey Lee
Jeff Woods as Flynn

Broadcast and reception

References

External links
 

1994 television films
1994 films
1994 drama films
1990s English-language films
American drama television films
Cultural depictions of Madonna
Films about Madonna
Films directed by Bradford May
Fox network original films
Biographical films about singers
1990s American films